The Roman Catholic Diocese of Mossoró is a diocese located in the city of Mossoró in the Ecclesiastical province of Natal in Brazil.

History
 July 28, 1934: Established as Diocese of Mossoró from the Diocese of Natal

Bishops
 Bishops of Mossoró (Roman rite), in reverse chronological order
 Bishop Mariano Manzana (2004.10.17 – present)
 Bishop José Freire de Oliveira Neto (1984.03.14 – 2004.06.15)
 Bishop Gentil Diniz Barreto (1960.06.11 – 1984.03.14)
 Bishop Elizeu Simões Mendes (1953.09.19 – 1959.10.17), appointed Bishop of Campo Mourão, Parana
 Bishop João Batista Portocarrero Costa (1943.07.31 – 1953.07.03), appointed Coadjutor Archbishop of Olinda e Recife, Pernambuco
 Bishop Jaime de Barros Câmara (1935.12.19 – 1941.09.15), appointed Archbishop of Belém do Pará; future Cardinal)

Coadjutor bishop
José Freire de Oliveira Neto (1979-1984)

Auxiliary bishop
José Freire de Oliveira Neto (1973-1979), appointed Coadjutor here

References
 GCatholic.org
 Catholic Hierarchy

Roman Catholic dioceses in Brazil
Christian organizations established in 1934
Mossoró, Roman Catholic Diocese of
Roman Catholic dioceses and prelatures established in the 20th century